Sagel is a surname. Notable people with the surname include:

 Robby Sagel (born 1995), American soccer player
 Rüdiger Sagel (born 1955), German politician

See also
 Sager
 Segel

German-language surnames
Surnames of German origin